Dead Right is the ninth novel by Canadian detective fiction writer Peter Robinson in the Inspector Banks series. It was published in 1997, and re-titled Blood at the Root in the US.

External links
Dedicated page on author's website

1997 Canadian novels
Novels by Peter Robinson (novelist)
Novels set in Yorkshire